The Cicadini are a tribe of cicadas.

Genera 
BioLib lists the following:
subtribe Cicadina Latreille, 1802
 Cicada (genus)
subtribe Oncotympanina Ishihara, 1961
 Neoncotympana Lee, 2010
 Oncotympana Stål, 1870
subtribe Psithyristriina Distant, 1905
 Basa (cicada) Distant, 1905
 Kamalata Distant, 1889
 Pomponia Stål, 1866
 Psithyristria Stål, 1870
 Semia Matsumura, 1916
 Terpnosia Distant, 1892

References

External links

 
Hemiptera tribes
Cicadinae